Adare is a village in County Limerick, Ireland.

Adare may also refer to:

Adare GAA, GAA club based in Adare
Adare Manor, manor house in Adare
Adare Productions, Irish entertainment company
Elizabeth Adare (born 1949), English actress, television presenter and child psychologist

Geography
Adare Peninsula, peninsula in Antarctica
Cape Adare, cape in Antarctica
Adare Saddle, mountain pass in Antarctica
Adare Seamounts, seamount in the Southern Ocean
Adare Trough, oceanic basin in Antarctica
Adare, Queensland, a locality in the Lockyer Valley Region, Queensland, Australia